Mert Müldür (born 3 April 1999) is a Turkish professional footballer who plays as a defender for Italian club Sassuolo and the Turkey national team. Mainly a right-back, Müldür is a versatile defender capable of playing in multiple positions.

Club career

Rapid Wien 
Müldür joined the SK Rapid Wien youth academy at the age of six in 2006, and worked his way up into the professional team. Müldür made his professional debut for SK Rapid in a 4–1 Austrian Football Bundesliga loss to FC Red Bull Salzburg on 13 May 2018. On 29 May 2018, Müldür signed his first professional contract for three years with Rapid Wien.

Sassuolo 
On 20 August 2019, Müldür signed with the Italian club U.S. Sassuolo Calcio. He made his debut five days later, coming on as a substitute in 2–1 away loss against Torino.

International career
Born in Austria to Turkish parents, Müldür is a youth international for Turkey. Müldür made his debut for the senior Turkey national team on 11 October 2018, in a 0–0 friendly against Bosnia and Herzegovina.

Career statistics

Club

International

Scores and results list Turkey's goal tally first, score column indicates score after each Müldür goal.

References

External links

 
 
 

1999 births
Living people
Austrian people of Turkish descent
Citizens of Turkey through descent
Turkish footballers
Austrian footballers
Footballers from Vienna
Association football defenders
Turkey international footballers
Turkey youth international footballers
UEFA Euro 2020 players
Serie A players
Austrian Football Bundesliga players
U.S. Sassuolo Calcio players
SK Rapid Wien players
Turkish expatriate footballers
Austrian expatriate footballers
Turkish expatriate sportspeople in Italy
Austrian expatriate sportspeople in Italy
Expatriate footballers in Italy